Gabare Glacier, Sentinel Range
 Gabrovo Knoll, Livingston Island  
 Galabinov Spur, Danco Coast
 Galabov Ridge, Alexander Island
 Galata Cove, Anvers Island  
 Galerius Peak, Alexander Island
 Galiche Rock, Robert Island  
 Galicia Peak, Vinson Massif
 Garbel Point, Liège Island  
 Garmen Point, Smith Island  
 Garnya Cove, Robert Island
 Garvan Point, Trinity Peninsula 
 Gaydari Peak, Graham Coast 
 Gaydarov Point, Cornwallis Island 
 Gega Point, Astrolabe Island  
 Gela Point, Livingston Island 
 Gergini Reef, Snow Island 
 Gerila Glacier, Sentinel Range
 Gerlovo Beach, Livingston Island  
 German Peninsula, Fallières Coast  
 Gerov Pass, Livingston Island 
 Gerritsz Bay, Anvers Island 
 Gesha Point, Clarence Island
 Ghiaurov Peak, Livingston Island 
 Mount Ghiuselev, Brabant Island 
 Gigen Peak, Trinity Peninsula 
 Gilbert Spur, Sentinel Range
 Ginkgo Tarn, Nelson Island
 Giridava Glacier, Clarence Island
 Glarus Island, Trinity Island
 Glavinitsa Peak, Fallières Coast  
 Glazne Buttress, Nordenskjöld Coast
 Glogovo Passage, Greenwich Island
 Glozhene Cove, Smith Island  
 Gluhar Hill, Foyn Coast
 Glumche Island, Low Island
 Godech Nunatak, Livingston Island  
 Golemani Peak, Sentinel Range  
 Goleminov Point, Alexander Island
 Golesh Bluff, Trinity Peninsula  
 Goloe Pass, Sentinel Range 
 Golyam Sechko Cove, Nelson Island
 Gomotartsi Knoll, Graham Coast
 Goreme Col, Sentinel Range 
 Gorichane Glacier, Brabant Island
 Goritsa Rocks, Livingston Island 
 Gornik Knoll, Trinity Peninsula  
 Gorublyane Knoll, Trinity Peninsula
 Gostilya Point, Loubet Coast  
 Gostun Point, Snow Island 
 Goten Peninsula, Anvers Island
 Govedare Peak, Oscar II Coast 
 Gramada Glacier, Smith Island  
 Grand Lagoon, Livingston Island  
 Graovo Rocks, Robert Island  
 Greben Hill, Trinity Peninsula
 Greblo Island, Wilhelm Archipelago
 Gredaro Point, Trinity Peninsula  
 Grigorov Glacier, Brabant Island  
 Grivitsa Ridge, Nordenskjöld Coast  
 Grod Island, Robert Island
 Groma Rock, Low Island 
 Gromshin Heights, Sentinel Range
 Grozden Peak, Fallières Coast
 Gruev Cove, Greenwich Island  
 Guangzhou Peninsula, Nelson Island
 Gubesh Peak, Sentinel Range 
 Gurev Gap, Livingston Island  
 Gurgulyat Peak, Trinity Peninsula
 Gurkovska Cove, Elephant Island 
 Gusla Peak, Nordenskjöld Coast
 Gutsal Ridge, Brabant Island

See also 
 Bulgarian toponyms in Antarctica

External links 
 Bulgarian Antarctic Gazetteer
 SCAR Composite Gazetteer of Antarctica
 Antarctic Digital Database (ADD). Scale 1:250000 topographic map of Antarctica with place-name search.
 L. Ivanov. Bulgarian toponymic presence in Antarctica. Polar Week at the National Museum of Natural History in Sofia, 2–6 December 2019

Bibliography 
 J. Stewart. Antarctica: An Encyclopedia. Jefferson, N.C. and London: McFarland, 2011. 1771 pp.  
 L. Ivanov. Bulgarian Names in Antarctica. Sofia: Manfred Wörner Foundation, 2021. Second edition. 539 pp.  (in Bulgarian)
 G. Bakardzhieva. Bulgarian toponyms in Antarctica. Paisiy Hilendarski University of Plovdiv: Research Papers. Vol. 56, Book 1, Part A, 2018 – Languages and Literature, pp. 104-119 (in Bulgarian)
 L. Ivanov and N. Ivanova. Bulgarian names. In: The World of Antarctica. Generis Publishing, 2022. pp. 114-115. 

Antarctica
 
Bulgarian toponyms in Antarctica
Names of places in Antarctica